Muḥammad ibn Hibbān al-Bustī (c. 270–354/884–965) was an Arab Muslim polymath and a prominent Shafi'i traditionist, ḥadith critic, evaluator of rijal (transmitters), compiler and interpreter of hadith. He was a prolific writer and well-versed in other science such as fiqh (reaching the level of Ijtihad) as well as in the sciences of astronomy, medicine, history and many other disciplines.

Biography

Birth
Ibn Hibban was born in 270 AH (884 CE) in Bust or Bost in present-day southern Afghanistan (former name of Helmand province capital was Bost or Bust, its new name is Lashkargah).

Education
Imam Ibn Hibban grew up in the city of Best, where he spent his childhood and early youth, then left for education. In thirst for knowledge, this imam was travelling countries from Transoxania and reaching far as Egypt. During these intense travels, he had numerous teachers whom he narrated from.

Teachers
He studied Islamic sciences with many prominent scientists of the time, such as:
 al-Nasa'i
 Al-Hasan ibn Sufyan
 Abu al-Ya'la al-Mosuli
 Al-Husayn ibn Idris al-Harawi
 Abu al-Khalifa al-Jamhi
 Imran ibn Musa ibn Madzhashi'
 Ahmad ibn al-Hasan al-Sufi
 Ja'far ibn Ahmad al-Dimashqi
 Ibn Khuzaymah

Career
Ibn Hibban became judge in Samarkand for a time and built a Khanqah in the town; and in 340 A. H./951 A. D. he went to his birth town, Bust and built there a madrasah for his students, in which they were given stipends.

Students
His most famous students became leading scholars of their time:
 Al-Hakim al-Nishapuri
 Al-Daraqutni
 Al-Khattabi
 Ibn Manda

Death
Ibn Faisal died in Bust on a Friday night, eight days before the end of the month of Shawwal in 354 AH. He was buried in his native town Bost or Bust (currently Lashkargah) in present-day southern Afghanistan.

Theology
When returning to Sijistan, after studying in Nishapur with Ibn Khuzaymah, Ibn Hibban was opposed by some of the Hanbalis as he taught that God does not have limits, rejecting their anthropomorphic belief in al-Hadd lillah (limits for God). Furthermore, these local Hanbalis accused him of Zandaqa (heresy) for his statement al-Nubuwwa 'ilmun wa 'amal (prophecy consists of a knowledge and action). Due to this he left for Samarkand, where he became a Judge.

One of his enemies, al-Sulaymani (d. 404/1014) claimed that Ibn Hibban owed his appointment to Samanid vizier Abu al-Tayyib al-Mu'sabi for whom he wrote a refutation of the Karmatis.

According to his own words, whenever he was in Mashhad during distress, he would visit Imam Reza Shrine and ask for relief that would always come, “time after time again.”

Reception
Al-Hakim , his student, the owner of the Al-Mustadra, said : “Abu Hatim Al-Basti Al-Qadi was one of the vessels of knowledge in language, jurisprudence, hadith and preaching, and among the wise men. He was classified, and he came out of the classification in the hadith that had not preceded him."

Al-Dhahabi said: "The imam, the scholar, the hafiz, the majestic, the sheikh of Khorasan… the author of the famous books."

Works
Khatib al-Baghdadi recommended 40 books of his for study. Most of his works have however perished even though he made an effort to preserve them by leaving his house and library in Nishapur as a Waqf for the transmission of his books. His Tarikh al-Thikat, a work of Ilm al-Rijal, was utilised by hadith critics such as al-Dhahabi, Ibn Hajar al-Asqalani etc.

In total, Ibn Hibban wrote almost 60 books on different topics of Islamic Science but his master piece is Sahih Ibn Hibban (originally titled: Al-Musnad al-Sahih ala al-Takasim wa al-Anwa). Some of them are listed below:
 Sahih Ibn Hibban (eighteen volumes)
 Kitab al Sahaba (five volumes)
 Kitab al Tabi`yyun (twelve volumes)
 Kitab al-Atba` al Tabi`yeen (fifteen volumes)
 Kitab Taba al-Atba` (seventeen volumes)
 Kitab Taba` al Taba` (twenty volumes)
 Kitab `ala al Awham (ten volumes)
 Kitab al Rihla (two volumes)
 Kitab al Fasl Bayna Akhbarna wa Haddathana 
 Tarikh al-Thiqat, 
 Ilal wa Awham al-Mu’arrikhin
 Ilal Manaqib al-Zuhri(twenty volumes)
 Ilal Hadith Malik(ten volumes)
 Ilal ma Asnada Abu Hanifah (ten volumes)
 Ghara’ib al-Kufiyeen(ten volumes) 
 Ghara’ib ahl al-Basrah (eight volumes)
 Mawquf ma Rufi`a (ten volumes)
 Al-Mu`jam `ala al-Mudun (ten volumes)
 Al-Hidayah ila al-`Ilm al-Sunan

Bibliography

References

External links
 Biodata at MuslimScholars.info

884 births
965 deaths
Shafi'is
9th-century Arabs
10th-century Arabs
Asharis
Kullabis
Hadith scholars
Hadith compilers
Sunni Muslim scholars of Islam
Biographical evaluation scholars
Year of birth uncertain